Gon, Burkina Faso is a village in the Zabré Department of Boulgou Province in south-eastern Burkina Faso. As of 2005, the village has a population of 810.

References

Populated places in the Centre-Est Region
Boulgou Province